Pennsylvania Supreme Court elections were held on November 3, 2015 to elect three justices to fill vacancies on the Pennsylvania Supreme Court. The seats were won by Kevin Dougherty, David Wecht, and Christine Donohue, all Democrats, resulting in a 5-2 Democratic majority.

Results

References 

21st century in Pennsylvania
2015 Pennsylvania elections